Pterophorus pentadactyla, commonly known as the white plume moth, is a moth in the family Pterophoridae. It is found in the West Palearctic including North Africa and Europe. It is uniformly white, with the hind wing pair divided in three feathery plumes and the front pair in another two. The moths fly from June to August. The larvae feed on bindweed (Convolvulus species).

Taxonomy
This moth was first described by Carl Linnaeus in 1758 in the 10th edition of Systema Naturae. He gave it the name Aciptilia pentadactyla, with the specific epithet being descriptive of the appearance of the wings, and coming from the Greek meaning "five fingers"; the insect was later transferred to the genus Pterophorus.

Description

The adult is pure white, the wings being divided into five slender feather-like plumes, two forming part of the forewing and three part of the hind wing. The insect is nocturnal, emerging at dusk, and is on the wing during June and July. The larvae are green, with a yellow dorsal stripe and tufts of pale hairs.

Distribution and habitat
This moth is found over much of Europe and the Middle East, as far east as Iran, also North Africa. In Britain, it is common in England and Wales but more local in southern Scotland and in the coastal parts of western, southern and eastern Ireland. It is typically found in rough grassland, on road verges and in gardens. The larva feeds on leaves and flowers of field bindweed, hedge bindweed and other members of the family Convolvulaceae. It hibernates, overwintering as a small larva.

Pest status
The sweet potato (Ipomoea batatas) is a member of the family Convolvulaceae, and in Nigeria, the larvae of the white plume moth feed on the plant. The moth is considered a pest species along with the sweet potato butterfly (Acraea acerata), leaf folders (Brachmia and Helcystogramma spp.), and sweet potato army worms (Spodoptera spp.).

References

pentadactyla
Moths described in 1758
Plume moths of Africa
Plume moths of Asia
Plume moths of Europe
Taxa named by Carl Linnaeus